Mount Meru, or Sumeru, is the sacred five-peaked mountain of Hindu, Jain, and Buddhist cosmology.

Mount Meru may also refer to:

 Mount Meru (Buddhism), the central world-mountain in Buddhist cosmology
 Mount Meru (Tanzania), an active stratovolcano
 Mount Meru University, Arusha, Tanzania
 Semeru, a mountain in Indonesia, with name derived from the Hindu-Buddhist mythical mountain of Meru or Sumeru, the abode of gods.
 Mount Kailash, a peak in the Kailash Range, also known as Meru Parvat or Sumeru